Hendrik Timmer (born 3 December 1971) is a Dutch former professional footballer who played as a goalkeeper.

Club career
Timmer was born in Hierden, Harderwijk, Gelderland. He spent his first 11 senior seasons in the second division, with FC Zwolle – named PEC in his first year. In 2000, he moved to AZ Alkmaar, making his Eredivisie debut at almost 29 and also serving unassuming loans at Feyenoord and AFC Ajax. He was part of the Feyenoord squad that won the 2001–02 UEFA Cup, and was an unused substitute in the final.

In 2003 Timmer returned to AZ for three more solid seasons, being essential as the club finished runner-up in the 2006 league and the following year's domestic cup. He made another return in the 2006 summer, now to Feyenoord, leaving Alkmaar after an alleged fall-out with manager Louis van Gaal.

Timmer retired from the game at almost 38, after helping Feyenoord to the seventh place in 2008–09 campaign, having appeared in 513 matches as a professional – only in the league. However, in March 2010, as SC Heerenveen had all three first-team goalkeepers on the injured list, he went on trial with the club and signed a contract until the end of the season, contributing with nine games to an eventual 11th place-finish, and retiring for good in June.

In June 2012, Timmer was appointed as technical/commercial manager of second level club AGOVV Apeldoorn.

International career
Somewhat of a late bloomer in the Dutch national side, Timmer did not get his first call-up until February 2005, being summoned by Marco van Basten for an exhibition game with England in Birmingham. His debut would only arrive on 12 November, in another friendly (1–3 home loss to Italy).

Timmer won seven caps for his country but never in official games, representing the nation at the 2006 FIFA World Cup and UEFA Euro 2008.

Personal life
Timmer is married to speed skater Marianne Timmer, however they are separated. After retiring in 2009, he said Heerenveen would be the only club he would play for if he decided to return, as she had previously experienced success in Heerenveen's Thialf.

Career statistics
Source:

Honours
Feyenoord
KNVB Cup: 2007–08
UEFA Cup: 2001–02

References

External links

Beijen profile 
Stats at Voetbal International 

Site of Henk and Marianne Timmer 

1971 births
Living people
People from Harderwijk
Footballers from Gelderland
Dutch footballers
Netherlands international footballers
Association football goalkeepers
PEC Zwolle players
AZ Alkmaar players
Feyenoord players
AFC Ajax players
SC Heerenveen players
Eerste Divisie players
Eredivisie players
2006 FIFA World Cup players
UEFA Euro 2008 players